The Latema road blast was a minor terror incident that occurred on 26 January 2019 on Latema road in Nairobi's Central Business District. The attack occurred after luggage containing an improvised explosive device detonated while it was being carried on a mkokoteni cart, injuring two people.

Background 
Kenya has suffered several terrorist attacks, the most recent being the Nairobi Dusitd2 complex attack. The main perpetrators behind the attacks have been Al-Shabaab militants who have been trying to overthrow the Kenyan backed Somali government.

Incident 
On the evening of 26 January 2019, at around 7 p.m., a middle aged cart pusher was approached by a man of Somali descent to ferry goods, including a box, from the Baba Dogo bus stop to the Kenya Cinema bus stop. As they were nearing the junction of Latema road and Tom Mboya road, the client pretended to have forgotten his ID in a nearby MPESA agent and rushed off, leaving the cart puller waiting. Shortly after he left, the goods being ferried exploded, injuring the cart pusher and a vendor.

Aftermath 
After the incident, anti-bomb squad and anti terror police units sealed off the area after evacuating the injured and searched for the owner of the goods. On the morning of 27 January 2019, the National police service advised members of the public to be vigilant and report any suspicious cases to the police.

See also 
 2011–14 terrorist attacks in Kenya
 2018 Inter-Continental Hotel Kabul attack
 Garissa University College attack (2015)
 2019 Nairobi Dusitd2 complex attack
 Terrorism in Kenya

References

2019 in Kenya
2010s in Nairobi
January 2019 crimes in Africa
January 2019 events in Africa
Terrorist incidents in Kenya in 2019
2019 Nairobi attack